Konstantinos Nikolopoulos was a Greek water polo player. He competed in the men's tournament at the 1920 Summer Olympics.

See also
 Greece men's Olympic water polo team records and statistics
 List of men's Olympic water polo tournament goalkeepers

References

External links
 

Year of birth missing
Year of death missing
Water polo goalkeepers
Greek male water polo players
Olympic water polo players of Greece
Water polo players at the 1920 Summer Olympics
Place of birth missing